Ihor Dmytrovych Likhovy (born 12 June 1957) is a Ukrainian statesman and public figure, diplomat, museologist, historian, culturologist,  Minister of Culture and Tourism of Ukraine (2005–2006), Ambassador Extraordinary and Plenipotentiary of Ukraine to the Republic of Belarus (2007–2010). In 1997, he was awarded the title Honored Worker of Ukraine Culture.

Biography
In 1989–2005 he was the director of the Shevchenko National Preserve in Kaniv, a researcher at the Institute of History of the National Academy of Sciences of Ukraine (2004-2005).

From October 5, 2005, to November 1, 2006 – Minister of culture of Ukraine.

From 6 February 2007 to 24 February 2010 — Ambassador of Ukraine to the Republic of Belarus.

From December 17, 2014, to April 20, 2016 — First Deputy Minister of Culture of Ukraine.

Also Ihor Likhovy is the author of numerous scientific works about Taras Shevchenko, problems of development of national culture, on museology and protection of monuments as well.

References

Links 

1957 births
Living people
Ukrainian political people
Culture and tourism ministers of Ukraine
Ambassadors of Ukraine to Belarus